Bellenden Seymour Hutcheson  (16 December 1883 – 9 April 1954) was an American-born Canadian recipient of the Victoria Cross (VC) during the First World War. The VC is the highest award for gallantry in the face of the enemy that can be awarded to British and Commonwealth forces. Hutcheson was one of the seven Canadians to be awarded the Victoria Cross for their deeds on one single day, 2 September 1918, for actions across the 30 km long Drocourt-Quéant Line near Arras, France. The other six were Arthur George Knight, William Henry Metcalf, Claude Joseph Patrick Nunney, Cyrus Wesley Peck, Walter Leigh Rayfield and John Francis Young.

Biography
Hutcheson was a graduate of Northwestern University Medical School. In 1915, he renounced his United States citizenship in order to join the Canadian Army as a medical officer. He reclaimed his American citizenship after the war.

He was 34 years old, and a captain in the Canadian Army Medical Corps, Canadian Expeditionary Force, attached to 75th (Mississauga) Battalion, during the First World War. He was awarded the MC in 1918 for attended to and dressing the wounded.

On 2 September 1918 in France, Captain Hutcheson went through the Drocourt-Quéant Support Line with his battalion, remaining on the field until every wounded man had been attended to. He dressed the wounds of a seriously hurt officer under terrific machine-gun and shell fire, and with the help of prisoners and his own men, succeeded in evacuating the officer to safety. Immediately afterwards, he rushed forward in full view of the enemy to attend a wounded sergeant, and having placed him in a shell-hole, dressed his wounds.

The citation reads:

Legacy
The 75th Battalion's lineage is today continued by the Toronto Scottish Regiment (Queen Elizabeth The Queen Mother's Own), a reserve infantry regiment of the Canadian Forces.  In 2009 a new armoury was opened in Etobicoke for the regiment.  This facility was named in honour of Captain Hutcheson.

References

External links
 Bellenden Hutcheson's digitized service file
 Canadian Great War Homepage: Bellenden Seymour Hutcheson
 Legion Magazine-The Magnificent Seven

Canadian World War I recipients of the Victoria Cross
Canadian recipients of the Military Cross
1883 births
1954 deaths
People from Mount Carmel, Illinois
American recipients of the Victoria Cross
Canadian Expeditionary Force officers
Naturalized citizens of Canada
Feinberg School of Medicine alumni
Deaths from cancer in Illinois
Military personnel from Illinois
Toronto Scottish Regiment (Queen Elizabeth The Queen Mother's Own)
American emigrants to Canada